William Wootton (by 1532 – 1556) was an English Member of Parliament and lawyer.

He was the second son of Sir Edward Wotton of Boughton Place, Boughton Malherbe, Kent, and the brother of Thomas Wotton (1521–1587), sheriff of Kent. His aunt Margaret was married to Thomas Grey, 2nd Marquess of Dorset.

On 17 December 1547 he married Mary, daughter of Sir John Dannett of Merstham, Surrey.

Wootton was a member of Lincoln's Inn. He was the Member of Parliament (MP) for Maidstone in March 1553 and for Gatton in 1554.

References

English MPs 1554–1555
English MPs 1553 (Edward VI)